Brenthia is a genus of moths in the family Choreutidae.

Species

Brenthia albimaculana (Snellen, 1875)
Brenthia anisopa Diakonoff, 1968
Brenthia ardens Meyrick, 1912
Brenthia buthusalis (Walker, 1863)
Brenthia caelicola Meyrick, 1910
Brenthia carola Meyrick, 1912
Brenthia catenata Meyrick, 1907
Brenthia confluxana (Walker, 1863)
Brenthia coronigera Meyrick, 1918
Brenthia cubana Heppner, 1985
Brenthia cyanaula Meyrick, 1912
Brenthia diplotaphra Meyrick, 1938
Brenthia dendronympha Meyrick, 1937
Brenthia elachista Walsingham, 1900
Brenthia elongata Heppner, 1985
Brenthia entoma Diakonoff, 1982
Brenthia excusana (Walker, 1863)
Brenthia formosensis Issiki, 1930
Brenthia gamicopis Meyrick, 1930
Brenthia gregori Heppner, 1985
Brenthia harmonica Meyrick, 1918
Brenthia hexaselena Meyrick, 1909
Brenthia hibiscusae Heppner, 1985
Brenthia leptocosma Meyrick, 1916
Brenthia leucatoma Meyrick, 1918
Brenthia melodica Meyrick, 1922
Brenthia monolychna Meyrick, 1915
Brenthia moriutii Arita, 1987
Brenthia nephelosema Diakonoff, 1978
Brenthia octogemmifera Walsingham, 1897
Brenthia ocularis (Felder & Rogenhofer, 1875)
Brenthia pavonacella Clemens, 1860
Brenthia pileae Arita, 1971
Brenthia pleiadopa Meyrick, 1921
Brenthia quadriforella Zeller, 1877
Brenthia salaconia Meyrick, 1910
Brenthia sapindella Busck, 1934
Brenthia spintheristis Meyrick, 1910
Brenthia thoracosema Diakonoff, 1982
Brenthia trilampas Meyrick, 1918
Brenthia trilitha Meyrick, 1907
Brenthia trimachaera Meyrick, 1927
Brenthia virginalis Meyrick, 1912
Brenthia yaeyamae Arita, 1971

External links

choreutidae.lifedesks.org

 
Choreutidae